Güçlü is a village in Yüksekova District in Hakkâri Province in Turkey. The village is populated by Kurds of the Dirî tribe and had a population of 846 in 2022.

The hamlet of hamlet of Duraklı is attached to Güçlü.

History 
The village was populated by 20 Assyrian families in 1850 and 5 families in 1877.

Population 
Population history from 2000 to 2022:

References 

Villages in Yüksekova District
Kurdish settlements in Hakkâri Province
Historic Assyrian communities in Turkey